Ulla Agneta Jones (née Andersson; born 18 June 1946) is a Swedish photographer, actress, singer-songwriter, and retired model. She appeared on numerous magazine covers during the 1960s, before she retired from the Ford Modelling Agency. She was married to American music producer Quincy Jones, with whom she had two children.

After living in California with Jones for several years, she legally separated from him and returned to Sweden with her children. She also calls herself Ulla Andesong (Swedish for spirit song).

Personal life
In 1966, when Andersson was 19, she met American musician and music producer Quincy Jones at a party in New York, given by TWA in honour of Frank Sinatra. After her and Jones' courtship, she left the 5th Avenue apartment she had been subletting in Manhattan from the producer Robert Evans and moved to California to live with Jones. In 1967, she and Jones married. She retired from her modeling career to raise their two children, Martina and Quincy Jones III.

After several years of marriage, Ulla Jones and the children returned to live in Sweden, where Ulla remains today (2014). When she moved, Ulla and Quincy Jones were formally separated, but they divorced in 1974, so that Jones could marry his longtime partner by then, actress Peggy Lipton, with whom he had two daughters. Ulla Jones agreed to complete the divorce and to a cash settlement. After receiving the small settlement, she moved out to the suburbs of Stockholm.

Career

Jones was discovered at the age of 15 in Stockholm by modelling giant Eileen Ford who immediately signed her and sent her to Paris. There she was trained as a model and began working, soon travelling the world for fashion shows and shoots in Europe, the United States, and Russia. She was photographed by such renowned fashion photographers of the day as Hiro, and her image appeared on international fashion magazines like Harper's Bazaar and Vogue.

In January 1976 Ulla Jones was cast as "Betty Sue" in Lars Jacob's first Stockholm production of Wild Side Story. Her performance was singled out for good notice in major press, but the run was cut short when one of the leads dropped out. Two fellow cast members were Christer Lindarw and Roger Jönsson, who there began their climb to fame in the subsequent act After Dark.

In January 1979 Jones began recording her debut album in Stockholm, Sweden. Jones had worked with a handful of musicians including producers Björn J:son Lindh and Lars Samuelson. She released her debut album "No Time No Space No Age No Race That's Nifty!" with twelve tracks, all except one written by her, in a mixture of various musical genres including pop, folk, country, and world. The album also featured one track sung by Turid Lundquist called "Long Legged Thilly" which was written by Jo-Ellen Lapidus and inspired by Jones. The album was released under Four Leaf Clover Records and remains her only record to date.

In 1984 Jones released her first single "Dirty Angels/Some People Like Blood" under Hawk records. The single wasn't followed by any further releases under Hawk Records.

In 2007 Jones authored her debut book, an autobiography called Red Carpet Blues, published by Bra böcker of Malmö.

Filmography

Stage

Discography

Studio albums

Singles

Writing and arrangement

References

Bibliography
Andersson, Ulla. Red Carpet Blues.
Jones, Quincy. Q: The Autobiography of Quincy Jones, 2001.

External links

Swedish female models
Entertainers from Stockholm
1946 births
Living people
Swedish folk singers
Swedish songwriters
Family of Quincy Jones